Zuhair Saeed Bakheet-Bilal (also spelled as Bakhit; born 13 July 1967) is an Emirati footballer who played as a striker for the United Arab Emirates national football team and Al Wasl FC in Dubai. He started playing for the national team in 1988 and retired from international football in 2001. He played in 5 Gulf Cup of Nations, 3 AFC Asian Cup of nations, and the 1990 FIFA World Cup in Italy.

See also
 List of men's footballers with 100 or more international caps

References

1967 births
Living people
Sportspeople from Dubai
Emirati footballers
1988 AFC Asian Cup players
1990 FIFA World Cup players
1992 AFC Asian Cup players
1996 AFC Asian Cup players
FIFA Century Club
Al-Wasl F.C. players
UAE Pro League players
United Arab Emirates international footballers
Association football forwards
Footballers at the 1994 Asian Games
Asian Games competitors for the United Arab Emirates